Emanuele Nicosia (11 January 1953 – 23 March 2016) was an automobile designer from Italy. He worked at Pininfarina for many years, designing the Jaguar XJS spyder in 1979 and working on the Ferrari 288 GTO and Testarossa. Later, he worked on the interior design of the Lamborghini Diablo and Bugatti EB110. 

Nicosia also worked on motorbike projects, and has collaborated with Mauro Forghieri, then of the Oral Engineering Group, designing racing motorbikes. In 2000 he developed a concept for a SUB (Sport Utility Bike) based on a Moto Guzzi 750 engine which was introduced at 2000 Bologna Motor Show.

He was head of Automotive Program at DYPDC Center for Automotive Research and Studies, started running his Beestudio design branch office in Pune, India. He went to RCA, London for specializing in design.

References

External links
Ferrari Testarossa
Beestudio design

Italian automobile designers
1953 births
2016 deaths

People from Catania